Group C of the 2002 Fed Cup Europe/Africa Zone Group II was one of four pools in the Europe/Africa Zone Group II of the 2002 Fed Cup. Three teams competed in a round robin competition, with the team placings determining where they will be positioned within the play-offs.

South Africa vs. Liechtenstein

Latvia vs. Algeria

South Africa vs. Latvia

Algeria vs. Liechtenstein

South Africa vs. Algeria

Latvia vs. Liechtenstein

See also
Fed Cup structure

References

External links
 Fed Cup website

2002 Fed Cup Europe/Africa Zone